Mervyn Richard Luckwell (born 29 November 1984) is a British javelin thrower. He was the sole javelin thrower on the team for Great Britain at the 2012 Summer Olympics.

He was born in Milton Keynes. Luckwell represented Great Britain at the European Team Championships in 2009 and 2010, and also the 2009 World Championships in Athletics.

Seasonal bests by year
2007 - 75.68
2008 - 74.98
2009 - 81.05
2010 - 80.08
2011 - 83.52
2012 - 82.15

References

External links 
Official website

1984 births
Living people
People from Milton Keynes
Sportspeople from Buckinghamshire
English male javelin throwers
British male javelin throwers
Olympic male javelin throwers
Olympic athletes of Great Britain
Athletes (track and field) at the 2012 Summer Olympics
World Athletics Championships athletes for Great Britain
British Athletics Championships winners